The 1971–72 Cypriot Cup was the 30th edition of the Cypriot Cup. A total of 32 clubs entered the competition. It began on 15 April 1972 with the first round and concluded on 12 June 1972 with the final which was held at GSP Stadium. Omonia won their 2nd Cypriot Cup trophy after beating Pezoporikos Larnaca 3–1 in the final.

Format 
In the 1971–72 Cypriot Cup, participated all the teams of the Cypriot First Division, the Cypriot Second Division and 8 of the 11 teams of the Cypriot Third Division (first eight of the league table; cup took place after the end of the league).

The competition consisted of five knock-out rounds. In all rounds each tie was played as a single leg and was held at the home ground of the one of the two teams, according to the draw results. Each tie winner was qualifying to the next round. If a match was drawn, extra time was following. If extra time was drawn, there was a replay at the ground of the team who were away for the first game. If the rematch was also drawn, then extra time was following and if the match remained drawn after extra time the winner was decided by penalty shoot-out.

The cup winner secured a place in the 1972–73 European Cup Winners' Cup.

First round 
At the first round the Cypriot First Division teams were not drawn together.

Second round

Quarter-finals

Semi-finals

Final

References

Sources

Bibliography

See also 
 Cypriot Cup
 1971–72 Cypriot First Division

Cypriot Cup seasons
1971–72 domestic association football cups
1971–72 in Cypriot football